Hang Them All may refer to:

 "Hang Them All", song by Tom T. Hall from the album I Witness Life
 "Hang Them All", song by Jay Reatard from the album Watch Me Fall
 "Hang Them All", song by Tapes 'n Tapes from the album Walk It Off

See also
 "Hang'Em All", song by Carpenter Brut from the album EP II
 Hang Em High (disambiguation)